Richardis of Sualafeldgau (Richwara;  – 8 July 994) was Margravine of Austria from 976 until 994 as consort of the first Babenberg margrave Leopold I.

Life
Richardis' descent has not been conclusively established: she possibly was a daughter of the Franconian count Ernst IV of Sualafeldgau, or may have been a daughter of the Ezzonid count Erenfried II and his wife Richwara of Zülpichgau. She was probably also related to Adalbero of Eppenstein, Duke of Carinthia from 1011/12 to 1035.

Richardis married Leopold I (-994) on a date unknown. Her husband was appointed Margrave of Austria by Emperor Otto II on 21 July 976, after the deposition of Margrave Burkhard.

She died in 994, according to several obituaries on the same day her husband was killed in a tournament in Würzburg.

Issue
Henry I (died 1018), succeeded his father as Margrave
Judith (Judita)
Ernest I (died 1015), became Duke of Swabia in 1012
Adalbert (985–1055), succeeded his elder brother Henry as Margrave 
Poppo (986–1047), Archbishop of Trier
 Kunigunda
Hemma, married Count Rapoto of Dießen
Christina, nun at Trier

References

Sources

Austrian royal consorts
994 deaths
10th-century women of the Holy Roman Empire
Women of medieval Austria
10th-century people of the Holy Roman Empire
People of medieval Austria